Tom Brooker (27 June 1908 – 22 July 1988) was an  Australian rules footballer who played with North Melbourne in the Victorian Football League (VFL).

Notes

External links 

1908 births
1988 deaths
Australian rules footballers from Victoria (Australia)
North Melbourne Football Club players
Port Melbourne Football Club players